The courts of England and Wales, supported administratively by His Majesty's Courts and Tribunals Service, are the civil and criminal courts responsible for the administration of justice in England and Wales.

The United Kingdom does not have a single unified legal system—England and Wales have one system, Scotland another, and Northern Ireland a third. There are exceptions to this rule; for example, in immigration law, the Asylum and Immigration Tribunal's jurisdiction covers the whole of the United Kingdom, while in employment law, there is a single system of employment tribunals for England, Wales, and Scotland but not Northern Ireland. Additionally, the Military Court Service has jurisdiction over all members of the armed forces of the United Kingdom in relation to  offences against military law.

The Court of Appeal, the High Court, the Crown Court, the County Court, and the magistrates' courts are administered by His Majesty's Courts and Tribunals Service, an executive agency of the Ministry of Justice.

There have been multiple calls from both Welsh academics and politicians however for a Wales criminal justice system.

Supreme Court of the United Kingdom

The Supreme Court of the United Kingdom is the highest appeal court in almost all cases in England and Wales. Before the Constitutional Reform Act 2005 this role was held by the House of Lords. The Supreme Court is also the highest court of appeal for devolution matters, a role previously held by the Judicial Committee of the Privy Council.

The Supreme Court has a separate administration from the other courts of England and Wales, and its administration is under a Chief Executive who is appointed by the President of the Supreme Court of the United Kingdom.

Senior Courts of England and Wales

The Senior Courts of England and Wales were originally created by the Judicature Acts as the "Supreme Court of Judicature". It was renamed the "Supreme Court of England and Wales" in 1981, and again to the "Senior Courts of England and Wales" by the Constitutional Reform Act 2005 (to distinguish it from the new Supreme Court of the United Kingdom). It consists of the following courts:

Court of Appeal (formally His Majesty's Court of Appeal in England)
High Court of Justice (High Court, formally His Majesty's High Court of Justice in England)
Crown Court

The Senior Courts of England and Wales, along with the Tribunals and other courts, are administered and supported by HM Courts and Tribunals Service.

Court of Appeal 

The Court of Appeal deals only with appeals from other courts or tribunals. The Court of Appeal consists of two divisions: the Civil Division hears appeals from the High Court and the County Court and certain superior tribunals, while the Criminal Division may only hear appeals from the Crown Court connected with a trial on indictment (i.e., for a serious offence). Its decisions are binding on all courts, including itself, apart from the Supreme Court.

High Court

The High Court of Justice functions both as a civil court of first instance and a criminal and civil appellate court for cases from the subordinate courts. It consists of three divisions: the King's Bench, the Chancery, and the Family divisions. The divisions of the High Court are not separate courts but have somewhat separate procedures and practices adapted to their purposes. Although particular kinds of cases will be assigned to each division depending on their subject matter, each division may exercise the jurisdiction of the High Court. However, beginning proceedings in the wrong division may result in a cost penalty.

The formation of The Business and Property Courts of England & Wales within the High Court was announced in March 2017, and launched in London in July 2017. The courts would in future administer the specialist jurisdictions that had previously been administered in the Queen's Bench Division under the names of the Admiralty Court, the Commercial Court, and the Technology & Construction Court, and under the Chancery Division's lists for Business, Company and Insolvency, Competition, Intellectual Property, Revenue, and Trusts and Probate.

Crown Court 

The Crown Court is a criminal court of both original and appellate jurisdiction which in addition handles a limited amount of civil business both at first instance and on appeal. It was established by the Courts Act 1971. It replaced the assizes whereby High Court judges would periodically travel around the country hearing cases, and quarter sessions which were courts held periodically in counties, county boroughs and certain boroughs. The Old Bailey is the unofficial name of London's most famous criminal court, which is now part of the Crown Court. Its official name is the "Central Criminal Court". The Crown Court also hears appeals from magistrates' courts.

The Crown Court is the only court in England and Wales that has the jurisdiction to try cases on indictment, and when exercising such a role, it is a superior court in that its judgments cannot be reviewed by the Administrative Court of the King's Bench Division of the High Court.

The Crown Court is an inferior court in respect of the other work it undertakes, viz. inter alia, appeals from the magistrates' courts and other tribunals.

Subordinate courts

The most common subordinate courts in England and Wales are

 County Court
 Family Court
 Magistrates' courts
 Youth courts

County Court

The County Court is a national court with a purely civil jurisdiction, sitting in 92 different towns and cities across England and Wales. As of 22 April 2014 there has been a single County Court for England and Wales where previously there was a series of courts.  The County Court is so named after the ancient sheriff's court held in each county, but it has no connection with it nor indeed was the jurisdiction of the county courts based on counties.

A County Court hearing is presided over by either a district or circuit judge and, except in a small minority of cases such as civil actions against the police, the judge sits alone as a trier of fact and law without assistance from a jury. The old county courts' divorce and family jurisdiction was passed on 22 April 2014 to the single Family Court.

Until unification in 2014, county courts were local courts in the sense that each one has an area over which certain kinds of jurisdiction, for example, proceedings for possession of the land had to be started in the county court in whose district the property lay, but in general, any county court in England and Wales could hear any action and claims were frequently transferred from court to court.

Family Court

The Family Court is a national court and has jurisdiction to hear all family cases in England and Wales. Local jurisdictional boundaries have disappeared and there is only one single jurisdiction for all family proceedings. The Family Court sits at many locations in England and Wales, and it usually sits at the County Court centres and magistrates courts where family work was previously heard by county courts or family proceedings courts. Family Court judges are now more categories of judges who will be eligible to hear family cases including lay magistrates, district judges, circuit judges, and High Court judges from the Family Division.

Magistrates' and youth courts
Magistrates' courts are the criminal court where all criminal proceedings start. They are presided over by a bench of magistrates (A.K.A. justices of the peace), or a legally trained district judge (formerly known as a stipendiary magistrate), sitting in each local justice area. There are no juries. They have jurisdiction to hear minor criminal cases, as well as certain licensing appeals. Youth courts are run on similar lines to adult magistrates' courts but deal with offenders aged between the ages of ten and seventeen inclusive. Youth courts are presided over by a specially trained subset of experienced adult magistrates or a district judge. Youth magistrates have a wider catalog of disposals available to them for dealing with young offenders and often hear more serious cases against youths (which for adults would normally be dealt with by the Crown Court). Youth courts are not open to the public for observation, only the parties involved in a case being admitted.

Prior to the enactment of the Crime and Courts Act 2013, some magistrates' courts were also a family proceedings court and heard family law cases including care cases and they had the power to make adoption orders. Family cases are no longer heard by the magistrates' courts, instead being heard by the single Family Court established by the 2013 Act.

Special courts and tribunals

In addition, there are many other specialist courts. These are often described as "tribunals" rather than courts, but the difference in name is meaningless. For example, an employment tribunal is an inferior court of record for the purposes of the law of contempt of court. In many cases, there is a statutory right of appeal from a tribunal to a particular court or specially constituted appellate tribunal. In the absence of a specific appeals court, the only remedy from a decision of a tribunal may be via judicial review to the High Court, which will often be more limited in scope than an appeal.

Examples of specialist courts are:
 Employment tribunals (formerly industrial tribunals) with an appeal to the Employment Appeal Tribunal
 the Employment Appeal Tribunal, which is a superior court of record, and therefore not subject to judicial review, appeals go to the Court of Appeal
 the First-tier Tribunal and the Upper Tribunal established under the Tribunals, Courts and Enforcement Act 2007 have absorbed the function of many pre-existing tribunals.

Coroners' courts
The post of coroner is ancient, dating from the 11th century, and coroners still sit today to determine the cause of death in situations where people have died in potentially suspicious circumstances, abroad, or in the care of central authority. They also have jurisdiction over treasure trove.

Ecclesiastical courts
The Church of England is an established church (i.e. it is the official state church) and formerly had exclusive or non-exclusive subject matter jurisdiction over marriage and divorce cases, testamentary matters, defamation, and several other areas. Since the 19th century, the jurisdiction of the ecclesiastical courts has narrowed principally to matters of church property and errant clergy. Each diocese has a "chancellor" (either a barrister or solicitor) who acts as a judge in the consistory court of the diocese. The bishop no longer has the right to preside personally, as he formerly did. Appeals lie to the Arches Court (in Canterbury) and the Chancery Court (in York), and from them to the Court of Ecclesiastical Causes Reserved (CECR). From the CECR appeals lie to the Judicial Committee of the Privy Council.

Military courts
Military courts of the United Kingdom include
 the Summary Appeal Court
 the Service Civilian Court
 the Court Martial
 the Court Martial Appeal Court

Other courts
Election court (ad-hoc courts hearing petitions against election results)
Barmote court (largely ceremonial court dealing with lead mining rights in Derbyshire)
The High Court of Chivalry (ancient and rarely convened court dealing with heraldry)
Verderers' courts (dealing with commoners' rights and related matters in the formerly royal hunting forests of the New Forest, the Forest of Dean and Epping Forest.)

Criminal cases

There are two kinds of criminal trials: "summary" and "on indictment". For an adult, summary trials take place in a magistrates' court, while trials on indictment take place in the Crown Court. Despite the possibility of two venues for trial, almost all criminal cases, however serious, commence in a magistrates' courts. It is possible to start a trial for an indictable offence by a voluntary bill of indictment, and go directly to the Crown Court, but that would be unusual.

A criminal case that starts in the magistrates' courts may begin either by the defendant being charged and then being brought forcibly before magistrates or by a summons to the defendant to appear on a certain day before the magistrates. A summons is usually confined to very minor offences. The hearing (of the charge or summons) before the magistrates is known as a "first appearance".

Offences are of three categories: indictable only, summary, and either way. Indictable only offences such as murder and rape must be tried on indictment in the Crown Court. On first appearance, the magistrates must immediately refer the defendant to the Crown Court for trial, their only role being to decide whether to remand the defendant on bail or in custody.

Summary offences, such as most motoring offences, are much less serious and most must be tried in a magistrates' court, although a few may be sent for trial to the Crown Court along with other offences that may be tried there (for example assault). The vast majority of offences are also concluded in a magistrates' court (over 90% of cases).

Either way offences are intermediate offences such as theft and, with the exception of low-value criminal damage, maybe tried either summarily (by magistrates) or by judge and jury in the Crown Court. If the magistrates consider that an either way offence is too serious for them to deal with, they may "decline jurisdiction" which means that the defendant will have to appear in the Crown Court. Conversely, even if the magistrates accept jurisdiction, an adult defendant has a right to compel a jury trial. Defendants under eighteen years of age do not have this right and will be tried in a youth court (similar to a magistrates' court) unless the case is homicide or else is particularly serious.

A magistrates' court is made up in two ways. Either a group (known as a "bench") of "lay magistrates", or a district judge, will hear the case. A lay bench must consist of at least three magistrates. Alternatively, a case may be heard by a district judge (formerly known as a stipendiary magistrate), who will be a qualified lawyer and will sit singly, but has the same powers as a lay bench. District judges usually sit in the more busy courts in cities or hear complex cases (e.g. extradition). Magistrates have limited sentencing powers.

In the Crown Court, the case is tried before a recorder (part-time judge), circuit judge or a High Court judge, and a jury. The seniority of the judge depends on the seriousness and complexity of the case. The jury is involved only if the defendant enters a plea of "not guilty".

Appeals

From the magistrates' courts, an appeal can be taken to the Crown Court on matters of fact and law or, on matters of law alone, to the Administrative Court of King's Bench Division of the High Court, which is called an appeal "by way of case stated". The magistrates' courts are also inferior courts and are therefore subject to judicial review.

The Crown Court is more complicated. When it is hearing a trial on indictment (a jury trial) it is treated as a superior court, which means that its decisions may not be judicially reviewed and appeal lies only to the Criminal Division of the Court of Appeal.

In other circumstances (for example when acting as an appeal court from a magistrates' court) the Crown Court is an inferior court, which means that it is subject to judicial review. When acting as an inferior court, appeals by way of case stated on matters of law may be made to the Administrative Court.

Appeals from the High Court, in criminal matters, lie only to the Supreme Court. Appeals from the Court of Appeal (Criminal Division) may also only be taken to the Supreme Court.

Appeals to the Supreme Court are unusual in that the court from which appeal is being made (either the High Court or the Court of Appeal) must certify that there is a point of law of general public importance. This additional control mechanism is not present with civil appeals and means that far fewer criminal appeals are heard by the Supreme Court.

Civil cases

Under the Civil Procedure Rules 1998, civil claims under £10,000 are dealt with in the County Court under the "small claims track". This is generally known to the lay public as "small claims court" but does not exist as a separate court. Claims between £10,000 and £25,000 that are capable of being tried within one day are allocated to the "fast track" and claims over £25,000 to the "multi-track". These "tracks" are labels for the use of the court system – the actual cases will be heard in the County Court or the High Court depending on their value.

For personal injury, defamation cases, and in some landlord and tenant disputes, the thresholds for each track have different values.

History

For nearly 300 years, from the time of the Norman Conquest until 1362, French was the language of the courts, rather than English. Until the twentieth century, many legal terms were still expressed in Latin.
The Supreme Court of Judicature was formed in 1875 from the merging of various courts then existing, such as the
Court of King's Bench
High Court of Chancery
Court of Exchequer
High Court of Admiralty
Court of Common Pleas
Court of Probate and Matrimonial Causes
Court of Common Pleas of the County Palatine of Lancaster
Court of Pleas of the County Palatine of Durham and Sadberge

The Court of Appeal in Chancery was merged into the Court of Appeal.

Other historical courts include:
House of Lords
Star Chamber
Court of High Commission
Court of Criminal Appeal
Court for Crown Cases Reserved
Courts of piepowders (marketplace courts)
Assize Court
Restrictive Practices Court
Courts leet
Quarter sessions

Local courts of special jurisdiction
The courts of session of the County Palatine of Chester and the Principality of Wales were abolished section 14 of by the Law Terms Act 1830.

The Court of the County of Durham was abolished by section 2 of the Durham (County Palatine) Act 1836.

The Stannaries Court was abolished by the Stannaries Court (Abolition) Act 1896.

The following courts were merged into the High Court by section 41 of the Courts Act 1971 following the report by Dr. Beeching:
The Court of Chancery of the County Palatine of Lancaster
The Court of Chancery of the County Palatine of Durham and Sadberge

Section 42 replaced the Mayor's and City of London Court with a county court of the same name.

Section 43 abolished:
The Tolzey and Pie Poudre Courts of the City and County of Bristol
The Liverpool Court of Passage
The Norwich Guildhall Court
The Court of Record for the Hundred of Salford

Section 221 of the Local Government Act 1972 abolished the borough civil courts listed in Schedule 28 to that Act.

Part II of Schedule 4 to the Administration of Justice Act 1977 curtailed the jurisdiction of certain other anomalous local courts.

See also
Canon Law
Courts of Northern Ireland
Courts of Scotland
English law
His Majesty's Courts Service
Judiciary of England and Wales
Legal year
List of courts in England and Wales
List of Supreme Court of Judicature cases
Personal Support Unit
Welsh Law

References

External links 
 HM Courts & Tribunals Service website
 Official list of senior judges in the courts of England and Wales
 Organisation of justice in England and Wales (pdf)

 

pl:System sądowniczy Wielkiej Brytanii